Rose Hill Cemetery is the second oldest cemetery (established 1876) in Arkadelphia, Arkansas.

History
Originally called Maddox Cemetery, it was renamed Rose Hill Cemetery in 1880.  Its prominent burials include leading citizens of the county, as well as the 7th Governor of Arkansas, Harris Flanagin (1817–18974).

The cemetery was listed on the National Register of Historic Places in 1999.

See also
National Register of Historic Places listings in Clark County, Arkansas

References

External links
 
 

Cemeteries on the National Register of Historic Places in Arkansas
Buildings and structures in Arkadelphia, Arkansas
National Register of Historic Places in Clark County, Arkansas
Cemeteries established in the 1870s
1876 establishments in Arkansas